{{Speciesbox
| status = CITES_A1 
| status_system = CITES 
| status_ref = 
 | taxon = Aloe albida
 | authority = (Stapf) Reynolds<ref name=ipni1>This species, under its treatment as Aloe albida (Stapf) Reynolds, was published in Journal of South African Botany. xiii. 101 (1947). Kirstenbosch. </ref>
 | synonyms = Leptaloe albida Stapf(basionym)<ref name=ipni2> The basionym of Aloe albida, Leptaloe albida Stapf, was originally published and described in Botanical Magazine; or, Flower-Garden Displayed 156: t. 9300. 1933. London. The type specimen was collected from the Vaal River region of South Africa </ref>
}}Aloe albida is a dwarf species of succulent plant.

Characteristics
Its flowers are small, white and borne on a single inflorescence. Its flowering time is usually in early autumn (March–April in the Southern Hemisphere), although it may begin to flower as early as February. The leaves form a rosette and have a waxy coating, which gives them a pale greyish/bluish green colour.

Habitat
It grows in montane grassland and in crevices among rocks where grasses are kept fairly short. It is found on the mountains in Barberton in Mpumalanga Province of South Africa to the northern border, of as well as parts of Eswatini (Swaziland).

See also
Aloe
Asphodelaceae
Succulent plants

References

albida
Plants described in 1933
Flora of the Northern Provinces
Flora of Swaziland